Idrissou Moustapha Agnidé  (born 31 December 1981, in Ifangni) is a Beninese former professional footballer who played as a midfielder.

Agnidé previously played several seasons for AS Vitré in the Championnat de France amateur.

He played for the Benin national team at the 2004 African Cup of Nations.

References

External links
 
 

1981 births
Living people
People from Plateau Department
Beninese footballers
Association football midfielders
Benin international footballers
2004 African Cup of Nations players
AS Dragons FC de l'Ouémé players
Mogas 90 FC players
FC Lorient players
Vannes OC players
AS Vitré players
Quimper Kerfeunteun F.C. players
Saint-Colomban Sportive Locminé players
Beninese expatriate footballers
Beninese expatriate sportspeople in France
Expatriate footballers in France